John A. Roche (August 12, 1844 – February 10, 1904) was an American politician from Illinois who served as Mayor of Chicago from 1887 to 1889. He was the 30th mayor of the city.

Biography

Early years

John A. Roche was born in Utica, New York on August 12, 1844. He served as an apprentice to his brother for three years. He stayed in business for a long time, and had but a high school education. He was a firm believer in education and mentions this in his inaugural address.

Move to Chicago

In 1867, he moved to Chicago to do business. He married Emma H. Howard in 1871.

He represented Cook County in the Illinois House of Representatives for one term in 1876.

In 1887, he was the Republican nominee for mayor. He won against the Socialist candidate, Robert L. Nelson in a race that lacked a Democratic Party nominee. People admired him for his assertive and straightforward nature and history of business.

He was sworn in as mayor on April 18, 1887.

As a mayor, he was prominent for the drainage and water supply commission and being appointed to suppress gambling in saloons as well as closing disreputable ones.

In 1889, he lost his bid for reelection, being defeated by Democratic Party nominee DeWitt Clinton Cregier.

His tenure as mayor ended on April 15, 1889.

Retirement

After retiring, he focused his attention once again on business, and became manager and vice president of the Crane Elevator Company. In 1893 he was elected president of the Lake Street Elevated Railroad Company. He then died on February 10, 1904, one hour after a meeting, from uremic poisoning. He was buried in Rosehill Cemetery in Chicago.

Works

 "Mayor John A. Roche Inaugural Address, April 18, 1887", Chicago Public Library.

Footnotes

Further reading

Tiwana, Shaw, & O'Brien, Ellen, & Benedict, Lyle. (2007). Inaugural Addresses of the Mayors of Chicago. Chicago, IL: Chicago Public Library Compilations.
Louise Pierce, Bessie. (1953). History of Chicago, volume III: The Rise and Fall of a Modern City. Chicago, IL: University of Chicago Press.
Hucke, Matt. (1996-2006). Rosehill Cemetery and Mausoleum. Retrieved December 12, 2007.
Torp, Kim. (2006). The History of Chicago's Mayors. Retrieved on December 12, 2007.

1844 births
1904 deaths
Burials at Rosehill Cemetery
Mayors of Chicago
Republican Party members of the Illinois House of Representatives
Politicians from Utica, New York
19th-century American politicians